Mariel Everton Cosmo da Silva (born 15 August 1980 in Palmares, Pernambuco), commonly known as Tozo, was a Brazilian footballer who last played as a midfielder for Santa Cruz.

External links
 Profile at TFF.org 
 Profile at footballstats.metro.co.uk
 Guardian Stats Centre

1980 births
Living people
Brazilian footballers
Clube Náutico Capibaribe players
Gençlerbirliği S.K. footballers
Hacettepe S.K. footballers
Kardemir Karabükspor footballers
Brazilian expatriate footballers
Brazilian expatriate sportspeople in Turkey
Expatriate footballers in Turkey
Süper Lig players
Association football midfielders